Mu'izz id-Din Mūhammed Rahim-Bek Bahadur (romanized: Muizziddin Mūhammed Rahim-Bek Bahadür),also spelled as Raiymbek Batyr, was a famous Kazakh warrior from the 18th century. The term Bahadur is an honorific term meaning "hero" in the Kazakh language, meaning that Rahim-Bek Bahadur's given name was simply Muizziddin Muhammed Rahim-Bek.  

He actively resisted the Dzungar invasion of Kazakh territories and played a major role in maintaining Kazakh freedom and independence.  Rahim-Bek saw the Kazakh Khanate as a hub of Muslim culture and felt that it was necessary to maintain its sovereignty at all costs.  Thus, he came to view the Kazakh-Dzungar Wars as a jihad in defending the land that is now the Muslim nation of Kazakhstan.   

Rahim-Bek was the grandson of a Kazakh diplomat, and prevailed on the Russian czarina Anna Ivanovna asking for protection from the Dzungars, one of the Oirat (West Mongolian) tribes that were the last remnants of the Mongol horse archer empire. He was instrumental in bringing the senior juz into a closer relationship with Russia in exchange for protection from the Dzungars.  This was a move that Kazakh rulers Abu'l Khair Khan and Abu'l-Mansur Khan worked to establish in the latter years of the Kazakh Khanate. 

He is the subject of a two-volume historical novel bearing his name. His name is commonly given to public features in Kazakhstan such as streets and mosques.

See also
 Raiymbek Batyr monument

References

Kazakh Khanate
18th-century Kazakhstani people
1705 births
1785 deaths